Edakkode is a village in Thiruvananthapuram district in the state of Kerala, India.

Demographics
 India census, Edakkode had a population of 11308 with 5378 males and 5930 females.

References

Villages in Thiruvananthapuram district